Hodgson's brown-toothed shrew (Episoriculus caudatus) is a species of mammal in the family Soricidae. It is found in China, India, and Myanmar.

References

Hodgson's brown-toothed shrew
Mammals of Nepal
Fauna of Sikkim
Fauna of Yunnan
Hodgsons's brown-toothed shrew
Taxonomy articles created by Polbot